Minister of Finance and Budget of Chad is a government minister in charge of the Ministry of Finance and Budget of Chad, responsible for public finances of the country.

Ministers
Djibrine Kherallah, 1959-1960
Ahmed Kotoko, 1960
Djibrine Kherallah, 1960-1961
Abdoulaye Lamana, 1962-1963
Djidingar Dono Ngardoum, ?-1965
Abakar Sanga Traoré, 1966-1968
Abdoulaye Lamana, 1968-1971
Djibrine Kherallah, 1971
Élie Roumba, 1971-1973
Bajoglo (Jacques) Baroum, 1973
N'Deingar Mbailemdana, 1973-1974
Negue Djogo, 1975-1976
Madengar Beremadje, 1976-1978
Ahmat Mahamat Saleh, 1978
Élie Roumba, 1978-1979
Kosnaye (Michel) N'Gangbet, 1979-1982
Jean Alingué Bawoyeu, 1982
Élie Roumba, 1982-1986
N'Deingar Mbailemdana, 1988-1990
Mohiddine Salah, 1990-1991
Gali Gatta Pierre N'Gothe, 1991
Mohiddine Salah, 1992
Abdelkader Safi, 1992-1993
Amos Reoulengar, 1993-1994
Albert Pahimi, 1994-1995
Mahamat Ahmat Alhabo, 1995-1996
Bichara Chérif Daoussa, 1996-2000
Mahamat Ali Hassan, 2000-2001
Mahamat Louani, 2001
Idriss Ahmat Idriss, 2001-2004
Ahmat Awad Sakine, 2004-2005
Ngeyam Djaibe, 2005
Abbas Mahamat Tolli, 2005-2008
Gata Ngoulou, 2008-2011
Christian Georges Diguimbaye, 2011-2013
Bedoumra Kordjé, 2013-2015
Ngarlenan Docdjengar, 2015-2016
Allamine Bourma Treye, 2016
Mbogo Ngabo Seli, 2016-2017
Christian Georges Diguimbaye, 2017
Abdoulaye Sabre Fadoul, 2017-2018
Issa Mahamat Abdelmahmout, 2018
Mahamat Allali Abakar, 2018-2019
Tahir Hamid Nguilin, 2019-

See also 
 Economy of Chad

References

External links 
 Ministry website

Government ministers of Chad

Economy of Chad